Son, I Loved You at Your Darkest is the first full-length studio album released in June 2005 by As Cities Burn.

Allusions
The album includes numerous allusions. "Thus from My Lips, by Yours, My Sin Is Purged" is a line from Shakespeare's Romeo and Juliet. Another example includes lyrics such as, "let the dead bury their own dead", from the song "Wake Dead Man, Wake". This is a line originally spoken by Jesus in The Gospel of Luke.

Track listing

Personnel
 Colin Kimble - rhythm guitar
 Cody Bonnette - lead guitar, clean vocals, piano
 Pascal Barone - bass
 Aaron Lunsford - drums, percussion
 TJ Bonnette - screamed vocals, programming, piano
 Lap steel on "Incomplete Is a Leech" - Troy Strains
 Piano on "Of Want and Misery: The Nothing That Kills", Crystal Ninja Strings - Matt Goldman
 Additional vocals on "Admission: Regret" - Josh Scogin
 Recording - Matt Goldman
 Mixing - Mike Watts
 Mastering - Troy Glessner
 Engineering - Tyler Orr, Troy Strains, Jeremiah Edwards
 Art - Asterik Studios

References 

As Cities Burn albums
2005 debut albums
Solid State Records albums